The Byer Covered Bridge, on SR 31 in Byer, Ohio, is a covered bridge built in c.1870.  It was listed on the National Register of Historic Places in 1975.  It has a Smith truss span.

It is a single-span wooden structure "lying on the banks of Pigeon Creek within the Wayne National Forest".

References

External links

Byer Covered Bridge at Bridges & Tunnels

Covered bridges in Ohio
National Register of Historic Places in Jackson County, Ohio
Bridges completed in 1870